Clue (known as Cluedo outside of North America) is a 1998 video game based on the board game of the same name. It is also known as Clue: Murder at Boddy Mansion or Cluedo: Murder at Blackwell Grange, depending on whether the country of release used American or British English.

Clue runs on Microsoft Windows. It was developed in 1998 for Hasbro Interactive by EAI.  Infogrames (now Atari) took over publishing rights for the game in 2000 when Hasbro Interactive went out of business. The game, just like the board game, is meant for 3-6 players due to the six suspects. The game garnered generally positive reviews upon release.

Engineering Animation released a spin-off named Clue Chronicles: Fatal Illusion in 1999.

Development
Clue was developed by a branch of Engineering Animation, Inc. called EAI Interactive. The development team was divided between EAI's interactive division in Salt Lake City, Utah and its main office in Ames, Iowa. Most of the programming and game design took place in Salt Lake, while most of the art and animations were developed in the Ames office. Development of the mansion, constructed piece by piece, began in Ames, but moved to Salt Lake City about halfway through the project.

It was developed as "the existing version [released in 1992] is not free and is also not that good. The AI, board presentations, and game mechanics of the existing version were all bad". This version of Clue aimed to "improve...on all of those areas with most of the emphasis put into the artificial intelligence of computer players in the game".

Development of Clue took approximately one year. Hasbro Interactive, the game's publisher, funded the project. Chris Nash, Lead Programmer on the game, who was interviewed by the official Cluedo fansite Cluedofan.com in May 2003, said that while it was a fun project to work on, "it was hard at times too, e.g. crunch time near the end".

He explained, in regard the design of the game: "We were given some freedom, but in the end Hasbro had final say on graphical treatments and such. One big flaw in the game is the lack of a visual for suggestions made. For example, Miss Scarlet in the kitchen with knife should have a visual representation somewhere on the screen, but it doesn't. This is because of a call by one designer at Hasbro". This was most probably due to cost/time factors - it would have required 6 * 6 * 9 = 324 suggestion animations. However the final cut-scenes were designed to be dark enough for the room to be unidentifiable, thereby overcoming this problem. He further explained: "The layout of the UI was the only real sore point for the whole game. The Game Designer wanted it one way, but Hasbro wanted it another. We did what Hasbro wanted despite the major flaw. For the look of the mansion and such, I think we were given a lot of freedom, however I wasn't involved much in this process. The art was handled in Ames, Iowa and I was in Salt Lake City, Utah. All I heard was that it should look 1920-30-ish. One early art lead (she was later replaced) wanted to make the entire mansion Art Nouveau or Art Deco, but Hasbro said she could do one room that way, but not the whole mansion". He recalled shared a cubicle with the interface designer who wanted to make most of the interface elements Art Deco, so Hasbro green lit the idea on the basis of consistent user interface. He summed up by saying: "Overall, as far as I know, Hasbro didn't nit-pick us about every little element. They gave some broad guidelines and let us go. Of course they had the final say on everything, but I don't think we bumped heads on too many things".

When asked if any of the characters were originally designed differently from how they turned out, Nash said: "In an early design document, which was never used, it was mentioned that Miss Scarlet should be from "indeterminate Asian origin". However, he adds: "I don't think any of the rest of the team envisioned her that way. I think the only guidelines we were given was that she be drop-dead gorgeous, which of course she is". He also refers to an unconfirmed rumour that "Miss Scarlet was modeled after our producer, Virginia".

The game does not include credits, but dozens of people were involved in Clue's development. Some of the more notable contributors include:

 Michael S. Glosecki, Executive Producer, Hasbro Interactive
 Bryan Brandenburg, Executive Producer, EAI Interactive
 Tom Zahorik, Producer, Hasbro Interactive
 Virginia McArthur, Producer, EAI Interactive
 Rick Raymer, Game Designer
 Tim Zwica, Art Lead
 Chris Nash, Lead Programmer
 Joshua Jensen, Lead EAGLE Programmer
 Mike Reed, AI Programmer
 Greg Thoenen, Programmer
 Darren Eggett, Programmer
 Steve Barkdull, Programmer
 Emily Modde, Level Designer
 Greg German, 3D Modeller
 Jonathan Herrmann, Cinematic Lighting
 Jason Wintersteller, Graphic Designer
 Cole Harris, Lead Tester

The same 3D characterisations in this game would later appear in the Cluedo-inspired title Fatal Illusion.

Clue enjoyed an unusually long shelf life for a video game. It went on sale late in 1998 and, as of 2007 was still for sale, available at many retail stores and via the Internet. The original game came in a box with holographic images. Later it was released in a jewel case, or as part of a collection, the Classic Game Collection (also including computer versions of Monopoly, The Game of Life, and Scrabble). At one point the game was offered free inside boxes of cereal alongside other Hasbro video games such as Operation. This was a call back to the time when the original publisher of Clue, Parker Brothers, was owned by General Mills.

AllGame explains that "to celebrate the 50th anniversary of the original Clue, the European release of Cluedo: Murder at Blackwell Grange, by Hasbro Interactive, introduces an updated version of its earlier computerized release".

Artificial intelligence
The artificial intelligence (AI) used by Clue's computer-controlled opponents is advanced for a computer board game conversion. The AI is so good at deriving solutions that many customers complained that the computer cheated. In fact, this is not the case: the computer-controlled characters are just much better than the average human player.

The AI works by keeping track of all players' suggestions. It even keeps track of information which most human players ignore. For example, if Player A suggests that Mr. Green did it with the rope in the lounge and Player B could not disprove it, most players would ignore this fact. But the computer records that Player B does not have Mr. Green, the rope or the lounge cards. Thus, if on a subsequent turn, Player A makes the suggestion of Mr. Green, the pipe in the lounge and Player B can disprove it, the AI knows that Player B has to have the pipe. In this manner the AI is able to determine which players have which cards without ever having to ask about them.

The game allows three difficulty levels for the AI. The easier AI's use a shorter history of game turns and the hardest one uses the entire game history. The AI was programmed by Mike Reed based on a design by Bob Pennington, who left EAI early in the project.

However, a report on a project funded by the National Science Foundation showed that "simple propositional reasoning [used to] encode the knowledge gained over the course of a game of Clue in order to deduce whether or not any given card is in any given place... clearly outperforms the "expert CPU" players in Hasbro Interactive's software Clue: Murder at Boddy mansion, making deductions of the case file contents well before the Hasbro Interactive's AI". A similar finding was released by Gettysburg College.

Gameplay
The game has the same objective as the board game it is based on: to find the murderer, the room which housed Mr. Boddy/Dr. Black's demise, and the weapon used

In addition to play by the original rules, Clue has an additional mode that allows movement via "points". Each turn begins with nine points and every action the player takes costs points. The player can only do as many things as he has points. For example, moving from square to square costs one point, making a suggestion costs three points. Many players prefer this mode of play as it makes the game more balanced since each player gets the same number of "moves" each turn. 

A few features of Clue:
 Detailed depictions of the characters made famous by the board game.
 A 3D isometric view.
 A top down view reminiscent of the board game.
 Video clips of the characters carrying out the crime (which garnered the game's T (Teen) rating).
 Online play via the Internet.

The Providence Journal described the game as having a "film-noir environment (like a murder-mystery movie of the 1940s)". Christian Spotlight explains that these can be switched off if one so chooses.

AllGame explains that "each room is richly created in loving detail, complete with exotic period furniture and secret passages. Both the mood and gameplay is enhanced by the deep, sonorous voice of the Butler as he announces events as they occur". Spong says: "Cluedo takes place mostly in the house where the murder was committed, creating a chilling atmosphere. Environments are beautifully rendered, featuring all characters from the original board game in full 3D".

Cnet explains, "Clue offers full animations of the characters walking from room to room. While this is interesting for a while, you'll probably want to play with the standard overhead view of the board. Along with the animations is a really good soundtrack that includes sounds of the storm outside the mansion and a forbidding butler who calls out each suggestion as it is played". It adds, "the "autonotes" feature that takes notes as to what cards you've seen doesn't record what suggestions have already been made, so making educated guesses as to which cards people don't have by their suggestions becomes a pen and paper experience".

The background music is inspired by genres such as jazz and film noir. Christian Spotlight said that "the music is a bit annoying, simply replaying the same bars over and over and over again. Thankfully, the music is quiet and not much of a distraction". It also added: "Click on some of the objects in each area and be surprised by the many short animations that unfold".

Spong says: "A multi-player option over LAN offers something new to Cluedo that only a video game can accomplish. Whether your playing head to head or co-operatively, the experience makes the game much more sociable and enjoyable. And it’s quite possible that this gameplay addition alone makes Cluedo: Murder at Blackwell Grange a thoroughly playable experience". The game was originally connected to the MSN Gaming Zone, but MSN stopped hosting the game. In-game links to online play now go to an invalid URL address. Christian Spotlight says: "The Internet play is absolutely flawless, even over a slow Internet connection. The game is stable and is supported quite well. Play with a few friends or family members around the computer or across the Internet. But for large groups in a single location, the original board game is much more easier than cramping around the computer keyboard and mouse".

The game uses an algorithm that allows it to be reusable, so that multiple levels are not needed. In Clue, "the idea is that of starting a new game each time. This particular game places a new puzzle to the player every new game so that the game is new to him/her every time" - having a different 3-card solution - despite using exactly the same game mechanics.

Cutscenes

Opening
The video opens on a view outside Blackwell Grange/Boddy Manor. The view cuts to the inside hall with the game's murderer, holding a lit candlestick, walking down the hall and entering one of the rooms. The candle is extinguished and silhouetted via a lightning flash, an indeterminate human figure prepares to strike the victim when the video cuts to the game's title.

Deal
Mr. Boddy/Dr. Black's spirit has returned to shuffle the cards and hand them out the players, in order for them to discover how he was murdered then puts the three cards representing the game's murderer, room and weapon in a briefcase. Clue is a direct conversion of the original game as a video game.

Murder
Every possible suspect and method of killing the victim is represented via a custom cutscene when a suggestion is made. These cutscenes are played through Mr. Boddy/Dr. Black's perspective. For example:
 The suspect stabbing with or throwing a knife at him
 Hanging, hitting, or strangling him with the rope
 Hitting him with the candlestick, wrench, or lead pipe
 Shooting him with a revolver

Jail
When the game is solved, the game's true killer walks into a jail cell and the door closes. The character's actions in the scene are as follows:
 Either Miss Scarlet (who poses), Colonel Mustard (who stands to attention), or Mrs. White (who dusts the wall) entering the jail cell 
 Mr. Green lying on the bed
 Mrs. Peacock sitting on the bed
 A sad Professor Plum sitting on a toilet

Reception
AllGame gave the game 3 out of 5, commenting that "the game's graphics and sound are excellent and add to the escalating feel of suspense", while adding that "so much is happening in the visually stunning backgrounds, or the deep, sinister soundtrack" that the sometimes-slow pace of the board game is unnoticeable. In a 1999 MABM review, Helen Ubinas said: "Whoever thought of moving this classic to disc had a clue". Computer Gaming World thought the game was "stunning", and thought the "sexy...mysterious" soundtrack could have been made for a feature film.

GameSpot gave it a rating of 7.6, saying: "Basically, if you love the board game, you're going to want this version. And if you haven't played the board game, buy this instead". CNET gave the game a 3.5-star rating, writing "this is probably more fun than playing the board game", while concluding that "overall, this is one of the best translations to the PC that Hasbro has ever done. Beyond the simple fault of some extra features that weren't implemented to their best effect, there aren't really many faults with the game". Christian Spotlight gave the game a rating of 4.5 out 5 stars, while Gamezebo gave the game a 4 out of 5 star rating.

The game was named "Video Game of the Week" on 1999-02-06 in the Fresno Bee.

See also 
 Cluedo characters
 Clue, the movie
 Clue (board game)

References

External links 
 
 EAI Develops "Clue Murder at Boddy Mansion" CD-ROM for Hasbro Interactive

1998 video games
Video game
Detective video games
Video games with isometric graphics
Video games based on board games
Video games developed in the United States
Windows games
Windows-only games
Works set in country houses
EAI Interactive games
Multiplayer and single-player video games